Marcus Plínio Diniz Paixão (born 1 August 1987), commonly known as Marcus Diniz, is a Brazilian professional footballer who plays as a defender for Hapoel Umm al-Fahm.

Club career
Diniz started his career at Caxias Futebol Clube, of the Itararé quarter. He spent nine years there before transferring to the youth system of Vasco da Gama. He then moved to Vitória, eventually returning to Caxias in 2004.

Milan
He signed with Milan in late 2004 and has been a featured player in Milan's youth system. Milan decided to loan him to Serie C1 club Monza to get some first team experience.

Livorno
At the beginning of the 2008–09 season he was transferred at Serie B club Livorno, on a co-ownership deal, for €300,000. In January he was sent on loan to Crotone.

Return to Milan and loans
In June 2009, Milan re-acquired Diniz back from Livorno, in exchange for Romano Perticone, though letting them keep the Brazilian on loan. Both players' 50% registration rights was valued €2.5 million and the loan cost Livorno €150,000.

At the start of the 2010–11 season, Diniz joined Parma on a new loan spell, for €750,000, which however was interrupted after only one month and the player was sent on another loan to Belgian side Eupen.

For the 2011–12 season, he was loaned out again, this time to Lega Pro Prima Divisione club Como, where he made 26 league appearances and scored one goal.

The following season, he joined Lega Pro Prima Divisione side Lecce on a new loan deal, which was extended for a further season a year later. For the 2014–15 season, Diniz stayed at Lecce for a third consecutive season on loan.

Padova
For the 2015–16 season, he joined to Lega Pro club Padova, signing a two-year contract.

References

External links 
 Profile at aic.football.it 

1987 births
Living people
Brazilian footballers
CR Vasco da Gama players
Esporte Clube Vitória players
A.C. Milan players
A.C. Monza players
F.C. Crotone players
U.S. Livorno 1915 players
Parma Calcio 1913 players
K.A.S. Eupen players
Como 1907 players
U.S. Lecce players
Calcio Padova players
FC Lausanne-Sport players
Hapoel Ironi Kiryat Shmona F.C. players
Maccabi Petah Tikva F.C. players
Hapoel Umm al-Fahm F.C. players
Serie A players
Serie B players
Serie C players
Belgian Pro League players
Israeli Premier League players
Liga Leumit players
Brazilian expatriate footballers
Brazilian expatriate sportspeople in Switzerland
Expatriate footballers in Italy
Expatriate footballers in Belgium
Expatriate footballers in Israel
Brazilian expatriate sportspeople in Italy
Brazilian expatriate sportspeople in Belgium
Brazilian expatriate sportspeople in Israel
Association football defenders